Imus is a city in the Philippines.

Imus may also refer to:

Imus (surname)

See also